Juanicó is a small industrial town located 35 km north of Montevideo, within the Canelones Department, Uruguay.

Location
The railroad tracks Montevideo - 25 de Agosto pass through the town.

History 
The town owes its current denomination to Francisco Juanicó, who, in 1830, finished with cattle raising. He then built up a winery who enabled him to produce high-quality wine, mainly due to the favorable conditions of the land.

On 19 November 2002, the status of the populated centre was elevated to "Villa" (town) by the Act of Ley Nº 17.587.

Population 
In 2011 Juanicó had a population of 1,305.
 
Source: Instituto Nacional de Estadística de Uruguay

Places of worship
 St. Thérèse of Lisieux Parish Church (Roman Catholic)

References

External links
INE map of Juanicó

Populated places in the Canelones Department